Holtville (also Slapout) is a census-designated place and unincorporated community in Elmore County, Alabama, United States. Its population was 4,096 as of the 2010 census.

Holtville/Slapout is located on the western bank of Lake Jordan, and much of its population lives along this lakeshore, or in the neighboring Lightwood community.

According to tradition, the old name of Slapout was derived from a storekeeper's way of stating an item was out of stock: he was "slap out of it".

Demographics
As of the 2020 US Census, Holtville/Slapout, AL had a population of 4940 residents.

Education
Holtville/Slapout is in the Elmore County Public School System,  served by Holtville Elementary, Middle, Junior High, and High School with a combined enrollment of 2115 students in 2021.

Notable people
Jessica Meuse, contestant on the thirteenth season of American Idol
Randy Nix, a Republican member of the Georgia House of Representatives for the 69th district.
Kirby Smart, Head football coach, University of Georgia

In popular culture
Holtville was the subject of a 1945 film by The United States Information Agency that highlighted how a rural community can overcome poverty and poor soil through education and commitment.".

See also
Slapout, Oklahoma

References

Census-designated places in Elmore County, Alabama
Census-designated places in Alabama